The Pratt & Whitney Canada PW600 series is a family of small turbofan engines developed by Pratt & Whitney Canada producing between  of thrust and powering the Eclipse 500/550, the Cessna Citation Mustang and the Embraer Phenom 100.

Development

The  thrust PW625F demonstrator engine was first run on 31 October 2001. It flew in late 2002.

In 2002, the PW610F was selected for the Eclipse 500 twinjet, replacing the EJ22 as Williams was unable to reach sufficient reliability. The  thrust engine was certified by Transport Canada on 27 July 2006. The aircraft received a preliminary certification on 27 July 2006 and was forst delivered on 31 December 2006. The Eclipse 500 production was halted in October 2008 after 260 were delivered, and 33 of the updated Eclipse 550 were delivered between 2014 and 2017.

The larger PW615F was selected to power the Cessna Citation Mustang in January 2003. The  thrust engine was certified on June 26, 2006. The aircraft was certified on 8 September 2006, and deliveries began on November 22. Production ended in 2017 after 479 aircraft were built.
This engine was to be used in the Eclipse 400 before it was cancelled, derated to  thrust.

The largest PW617F was selected for the Embraer Phenom 100 in May 2005, design work began in July 2005, it first ran on 29 June 2006 and first flew in mid-October 2006. The  thrust engine was certified on 9 september 2008. The aircraft was certified in December 2008 and was first delivered on 24 December. By the end of 2021, 392 Phenom 100s had been delivered.

Design

The two spool turbofan has a single front fan powered by a single stage turbine, a compressor with a mixed flow first stage (a diagonal compressor) and a centrifugal second stage powered by a single stage HP turbine and a reverse flow combustor.
This configuration was described in a PW&C patent filed on 6 October 2000. 

The fan is a snubberless design, with wide chord blades integral with the rotor hub, and the design features a forced mixer/common exhaust.
Hispano-Suiza Canada designed and manufactures the dual channel FADEC.

Variants
PW610F 
PW615F 
PW617F

Applications
 Cessna Citation Mustang 
 Eclipse 400
 Eclipse 500
 Embraer Phenom 100

Specifications

See also

References

External links

 Pratt & Whitney Canada PW600 page

Medium-bypass turbofan engines
2000s turbofan engines
Pratt & Whitney Canada aircraft engines